The 2023 Men's EuroHockey Indoor Club Cup was scheduled to be the 33rd edition of the Men's EuroHockey Indoor Club Cup, Europe's premier men's club indoor hockey tournament organized by the European Hockey Federation. It was scheduled to be held at the Alanya Atatürk Spor Salonu in Alanya, Turkey from 17 to 19 February 2023. On 10 February 2023, it was announced the tournament was cancelled due to the impact of the 2023 Turkey–Syria earthquake.

Qualified teams
Participating clubs qualified based on their country's final rankings from the 2022 competition. Teams from Belarus and Russia were excluded from the tournament due to their involvement in the 2022 Russian invasion of Ukraine.

  Mladost
  Post SV
  Complutense
  Gaziantep
  Grunwald Poznań
  Léopold
  LUC Ronchin
  Wimbledon

See also
 2022–23 Men's Euro Hockey League
 2023 Women's EuroHockey Indoor Club Cup

References

Men's EuroHockey Indoor Club Cup
Club Cup
2023 Turkey–Syria earthquake
Cancelled sports events